Cohors I Hispanorum may refer to:
 Cohors I Flavia Ulpia Hispanorum milliaria equitata civium Romanorum
 Cohors I Hispanorum [quingenaria peditata] pia fidelis